The Condemned 2 (also known as The Condemned 2: Desert Prey) is a 2015 American action film directed by Roel Reiné and released by WWE Studios. The film stars Randy Orton, Eric Roberts and Wes Studi. It is the stand-alone sequel to the 2007 action film The Condemned starring Stone Cold Steve Austin. It was distributed via a limited release in the United States and to video on demand on November 6, 2015.

Plot
Similar to the first movie, the protagonist Will (Randy Orton) finds himself in a game of death with several other contestants and is forced to rely on his skills and wits to survive.

Cast
 Randy Orton as Will Tanner
 Eric Roberts as Frank Tanner
 Wes Studi as Cyrus Merrick
 Steven Michael Quezada as Raul Bacarro
 Bill Stinchcomb as Harrigan
 Alex Knight as Cooper
 Dylan Kenin as Travis
 Michael Sheets as James Lange
 Morse Bicknell as Ryan Michaels
 Mark Siversten as Sheriff Eric Ross
 Merritt Glover as Deputy #1
 Matthew Page as Deputy #2
 Stafford Douglas as Hacker Rolf
 Esodie Geiger as Judge H. Onorable
 Audrey Walters as Ada Carlos Gomez
 Monique Candelaria as Danielle Hill
 Jesi Raelyn Rael as Lena
 Sonia Maslovskaya as Alexi

Production
On November 4, 2014, Randy Orton took time off from WWE television. New Mexico Film Office Director Nick Maniatis announced on November 12, 2014 that The Condemned 2, produced by WWE Studios and Lions Gate Films would begin principal photography in New Mexico.

The film was shot in Albuquerque and Zia Pueblo, New Mexico, from November 14 until December 15, 2014.

Reception
Dennis Harvey of Variety described it as "a belated, barely related sequel generic enough to make the eminently forgettable 2007 original look like an oasis of cinematic personality".

References

External links
 
 

2015 films
2015 action thriller films
American action thriller films
American sequel films
Films about death games
2010s English-language films
Films directed by Roel Reiné
Films shot in New Mexico
Lionsgate films
WWE Studios films
2010s American films